Nicholas Stephen "Nicki" Paterson (born 19 January 1985, in Lanark) is a Scottish footballer who plays as a midfielder for Albion Rovers.

Career

Early career in Scotland
Paterson grew up in Motherwell, and was a member of the academy at Scottish football club Motherwell, before signing a professional deal with Hamilton Academical in 2002. He made his professional debut on 3 August 2002 in a Scottish Second Division game against Cowdenbeath as a 17-year-old. He went on to play seven league, two Scottish League Cup and one Scottish Challenge Cup games for Hamilton over the next two seasons, usually from the substitute's bench, before leaving at the end of the 2003–2004 season.

College and amateur
Paterson moved to the United States in 2005 after being offered a college scholarship by the University of Nevada Las Vegas. He played four years college soccer for the UNLV Rebels, earning Second Team All-Mountain Pacific Sports Federation honours as a sophomore in 2006. During his college years Paterson also played two seasons for Des Moines Menace in the USL Premier Development League scoring 15 goals earning top scorer in both seasons.

Professional
Paterson returned to the professional ranks in 2009 when he was signed by the Harrisburg City Islanders of the USL Second Division. He made his debut for Harrisburg on 18 April 2009 in a 2–2 opening day tie with the Richmond Kickers.

After playing for USL-2 club Real Maryland Monarchs in 2010, Paterson transferred up a division to USSF Division 2 club AC St. Louis. However, after only a few days at the club it emerged that Paterson could not extend his current visa and had to return to the UK with an option to sign with AC St. Louis next season.

While home Paterson signed a short-term contract for Scottish side Clyde in September 2010, and played his first game for the team on 25 September, a 0–0 draw against East Stirlingshire. He scored his first goal for the Bully Wee on 16 October, in a 3–2 loss to Arbroath.

Paterson signed a contract on 21 January 2011 to play for Charleston Battery in the American Soccer USL Pro league. He led the team in scoring with 8 goals and was named the offensive MVP. He moved indoors for the 2011–12 season with the Baltimore Blast. In 2012, Paterson increased his offensive output from his midfield position and was the league's second top scorer with 10 goals amassing 22 points. He was selected 7 times to the USL Team of the week. Paterson for the second year running was named the Offensive MVP for the Charleston Battery and added the overall team MVP.

On 6 November 2013, he became Ottawa Fury FC's first signing.

Paterson signed with the NASL's Indy Eleven on 26 January 2016. After almost a year with the club, Paterson returned to his native Scotland, signing for Scottish League One side East Fife until the end of the 2016–17 season, at which point his contract was not renewed and he left the club.

Paterson subsequently signed a short-term contract with Scottish League Two club Stenhousemuir in September 2017.

Ahead of the 2019–20 season, Paterson signed for Albion Rovers.

References

External links

UNLV bio

1985 births
Living people
Scottish footballers
Scottish expatriate footballers
Scottish expatriate sportspeople in the United States
Hamilton Academical F.C. players
Des Moines Menace players
Penn FC players
Real Maryland F.C. players
Charleston Battery players
Clyde F.C. players
Ottawa Fury FC players
East Fife F.C. players
Stenhousemuir F.C. players
Albion Rovers F.C. players
Scottish Football League players
Scottish Professional Football League players
USL League Two players
USL Second Division players
USL Championship players
UNLV Rebels men's soccer players
Expatriate soccer players in the United States
Expatriate soccer players in Canada
North American Soccer League players
Sportspeople from Lanark
Association football midfielders
Scottish expatriate sportspeople in Canada
Footballers from South Lanarkshire